FIBA Europe South Conference was a basketball tournament of FIBA Europe Conference South held from 2002 to 2005. It was part of FIBA Europe Cup tournament. In tournament includes teams from Bulgaria, Turkey, Romania, Serbia, Macedonia, Greece, Croatia, Bosnia and Herzegovina, Georgia and Slovenia. The tournament takes place in three stages. The first is the group stage and the second playoff, and the third stage is the Final Four.

Final Conference north 2002/2003

Final Conference north 2003/2004

Final Conference north 2004/2005

See also
 Eurocup Basketball
 EuroChallenge
 FIBA EuroCup Challenge
 FIBA Europe Conference North
 Balkan International Basketball League

External links
http://www.fibaeurope.com/default.asp
http://www.linguasport.com/baloncesto/internacional/clubes/FIBA_ECC/FIBA_ECC_e.htm

FIBA EuroChallenge